The Army of the Holy Roman Empire (Reichsheer or Reichsarmatur) was created in 1422 and came to an end when the Holy Roman Empire was dissolved in 1806 as a result of the Napoleonic Wars. 

The Army of the Empire did not constitute a permanent standing army which was always at the ready to fight for the Empire. When there was danger, an Army of the Empire was mustered from among the elements constituting it, in order to conduct an imperial military campaign or Reichsheerfahrt during an Imperial War (Reichskrieg) or an Imperial Execution (Reichsexekution). It could only be deployed with the consent of the Imperial Diet and should not be confused with the Imperial Army (Kaiserliche Armee) of the Emperor.

In practice, the various forces of the Army of the Empire often had stronger local allegiances than their loyalty to the Emperor.

History

Prompted by the threat posed by the Hussites, the Imperial Diet of 1422 held in Nuremberg created the Army of the Empire by demanding specific contingents of troops from the various parts of the Empire. The Hussite Wars continued from 1420 to 1434, by which point the army had proved its worth. Over the next hundred years, the size of the Army was controlled either by the number of serving men being strictly regulated or by limits on the money that paid for it. At the Diet of Worms in 1521 a commitment was made to keep the strength at 20,063 infantry and 4,202 cavalry. This was later simplified to 20,000 and 4,000. The monthly cost of paying for an army of this size was known as the Roman Month (Römermonat).
The Imperial Register (Reichsmatrikel or Heeresmatrikel) determined the contributions of the individual states making up the Empire, the first being the Register of 1422.

Contrary to popular belief, the Army of the Empire did not take part in the Thirty Years' War of 1618 to 1648. The Emperor participated in this war with the Imperial Army (Kaiserliche Armee) instead.

The Constitution of the Army of the Empire (Reichsdefensionalordnung) of 1681 finally determined the composition of the army, fixing the contingents to be provided by the various Imperial Circles. The simple total strength (called in Latin the Simplum) was now fixed at 40,000 men, consisting of 28,000 infantry and 12,000 cavalry, including 2,000 dragoons (that is, mounted infantry). In emergencies, the size of the army could be increased by doubling or tripling the contingents. Such multiples were called in Latin the duplum and the triplum.

The figures for the contingents to be supplied by each Imperial Circle were little altered until the demise of the Empire. In practice, they were organized into a number of separate regiments. In some cases, money was provided instead of men to fulfil these military obligations to the Emperor.

Campaigns 
Between the 1590s and the French Revolutionary and Napoleonic Wars, the Army fought in the wars directly affecting the Empire, usually with units of the Imperial Army of the Empire and other local territorial forces. It did not take part in the Thirty Years' War of 1618 to 1648.
 Austro-Turkish War (1663–1664)
 Franco-Dutch War (1673–1679)
 Nine Years' War (1688–1697)
 War of the Spanish Succession (1701–1714)
 War of the Polish Succession (1734–1735)
 War of the First Coalition (1792–1797)
 War of the Second Coalition (1798–1801)

End

In 1804, the imperial forces originating from the lands of the new Emperor of Austria, a title created that year, became the Imperial and Royal Army (Kaiserlich-königliche Armee), which was defeated by the French at the battles of Ulm and Austerlitz in 1805. In 1806 the victorious French organized much of the former empire into the Confederation of the Rhine, a grouping of client states of the French Empire, with a common federal army.

Further reading
Vladimir Brnardic, Darko Pavlovic, Imperial Armies of the Thirty Years' War (2009)
John G. Gagliardo, Reich and nation: the Holy Roman Empire as idea and reality, 1763-1806 (Indiana University Press, 1980)
Winfried Dotzauer, Die deutschen Reichskreise (1383–1806) (Stuttgart 1998)
Max Jähns, 'Zur Geschichte der Kriegsverfassung des deutschen Reiches' in Preußische Jahrbücher 39 (1877)
Karl Linnebach, 'Reichskriegsverfassung und Reichsarmee von 1648 bis 1806' in Karl Linnebach, Deutsche Heeresgeschichte (Hamburg 1943, 2nd ed.)
Helmut Neuhaus, 'Das Reich im Kampf gegen Friedrich den Großen - Reichsarmee und Reichskriegführung im Siebenjährigen Krieg' in Bernhard Kröner, Europa im Zeitalter Friedrichs des Großen - Wirtschaft, Gesellschaft, Kriege (Munich, 1989), pp. 213–243
Martin Rink, Harald Potempa, 'Der Zusammenbruch des Alten Reichs (962-1806) und des alten Preußen im Jahre 1806' in Militärgeschichte March 2006
Hanns Weigl, Die Kriegsverfassung des alten deutschen Reiches von der Wormser Matrikel bis zur Auflösung (Bamberg, 1912)

See also
Hofkriegsrat
List of Lieutenant Field Marshals of the Holy Roman Empire

Notes

External links 

 
Military history of the Holy Roman Empire
1420s establishments in the Holy Roman Empire
1422 establishments in Europe
Military units and formations established in the 15th century